"Who Dares Wins" is the motto of several special forces elite units worldwide.

Who Dares Wins may also refer to:


Film and TV
 Who Dares Wins (film), a 1982 British action film on the SAS
 Who Dares Wins (TV series), a British comedy sketch show broadcast between 1983 and 1988 
 Who Dares Wins (Australian game show), broadcast between 1996 and 1998
 Who Dares Wins (British game show), broadcast from 2007
 SAS: Who Dares Wins, broadcast from 2015
 SAS Australia: Who Dares Wins, broadcast from 2020

Music

Albums
He Who Dares Wins (Live at the Warehouse Leeds) (1981), by Theatre of Hate
He Who Dares Wins Live in Berlin (1982), by Theatre of Hate
 Who Dares Wins (album), by Bolt Thrower

Songs
 "Who Dares Wins", on Original Pirate Material by The Streets 
"Who Dares Wins", on Classical Gas (Tommy Emmanuel album)
"Who Dares Wins", by Ian Cussick in 1986
"Who Dares Wins", by Rene Froger in 1988
"Who Dares Wins", by Derek B in 1990

Other uses
 Who Dares Wins, a book on Britain from 1979 to 1982 by Dominic Sandbrook
 Who Dares Wins, a computer game by Alligata